Joshua Autajay Umandal (born March 8, 1998) is a Filipino volleyball player who last played for Bahraini club Bani Jamra and the Philippine national team.

Career

Early career
Umandal attended the University of the East (UE) playing junior volleyball for the UE Warriors in the UAAP. He was scouted as an elementary student by UE when the institution held a training camp at his school, the Barrio Obrero Elementary School in Maypajo, Manila.

He moved to the University of Santo Tomas (UST), but he had to serve a year of residency in order to play for the Growling Tigers in the UAAP. He played with the Tigers for the meantime in the Collegiate Conference of the Premier Volleyball League (PVL) during the 2017 season. Umandal would make his senior UAAP debut with UST in 2018 in Season 80. His last appearance in the UAAP would be in Season 82 which was cancelled due to the COVID-19 pandemic.

Club
Umandal has played for the PLDT at the Spikers' Turf.

In 2021, Umandal was part of Rebisco PH, the Philippine men's national team competing as a club side. Rebisco PH participated at the 2021 Asian Men's Club Volleyball Championship where it placed ninth.

In January 2022, Umandal was signed in to play for Bani Jamra of the Isa bin Rashid Volleyball League, a first division league in Bahrain. Umandal won one out of six games he played for Bani Jamra. He ended his stint with the club in February 2022.

National team
Umandal has been part of the Philippine men's national team. He was part of the squad which won silver in the men's tournament of the 2019 Southeast Asian Games.

References

University of the East alumni
Filipino men's volleyball players
University Athletic Association of the Philippines volleyball players
Living people
Competitors at the 2019 Southeast Asian Games
Southeast Asian Games medalists in volleyball
Southeast Asian Games silver medalists for the Philippines
University of Santo Tomas alumni
Filipino expatriates in Bahrain
Filipino expatriate volleyball players
1998 births